The El Tranquilo Group is a geologic group dating to roughly between 228 and 200 million years ago and covering part of the Late Triassic. The El Tranquilo Group is found in the Austral Basin of Santa Cruz Province of Argentina. Fossil flora and purported fossils of the prosauropod dinosaur Mussaurus have been recovered from the El Tranquilo Sandstone. In older publications, the group was defined as a formation. The group contains the Laguna Colorada Formation.

References 

Geologic groups of South America
Geologic formations of Argentina
Upper Triassic Series
Late Triassic South America
Triassic System of South America
Triassic Argentina
Sandstone formations
Groups
Fossiliferous stratigraphic units of South America
Paleontology in Argentina